Goby is a common name for many species of small to medium sized ray-finned fish, normally with large heads and tapered bodies, which are found in marine, brackish and freshwater environments. Traditionally most of the species called gobies have been classified in the order Perciformes as the suborder Gobioidei but in the 5th Edition of Fishes of the World this suborder is elevated to an order Gobiiformes within the clade Percomorpha. Not all the species in the Gobiiformes are referred to as gobies and the "true gobies" are placed in the family Gobiidae, while other species referred to as gobies have been placed in the Oxudercidae. Goby is also used to describe some species which are not classified within the order Gobiiformes, such as the engineer goby or convict blenny Pholidichthys leucotaenia. The word goby derives from the Latin gobius meaning "gudgeon", and some species of goby, especially the sleeper gobies in the family Eleotridae and some of the dartfishes are called "gudgeons", especially in Australia.

See also
Gobius

References

Gobiiformes
Fish common names